A cap is a flat headgear, usually with a visor. Caps have crowns that fit very close to the head. They made their first appearance as early as 3200 BC. Caps typically have a visor, or no brim at all. They are popular in casual and informal settings, and are seen in sports and fashion.  They are typically designed for warmth, and often incorporate a visor to block sunlight from the eyes. They come in many shapes, sizes, and are of different brands. Baseball caps are one of the most common types of cap.

Types

 Ascot cap
 Ayam
 Baggy green
 Balmoral
 Beanie (North America)
 Bearskin
 Beret
 Biretta
 Busby
 Canterbury cap
 Cap and bells
 Cap of maintenance
 Casquette
 Caubeen
 Caul
 Coif
 Combination cap (also known as a service cap)
 Coppola
 Cricket cap
 Deerstalker
 Do-rag
 Dutch cap
 Dixie cup, an enlisted sailor's cap, also worn by first-year midshipmen at Annapolis
 Fez
 Flat cap (also known as a Kerry cap in Ireland (slang of Paddy cap – see also Caubeen), longshoreman's cap, scally cap, Wigens cap, ivy cap, golf cap, duffer cap, driving cap, bicycle cap, Jeff cap, or in Scotland, bunnet, or in Wales, Dai cap, or in England or New Zealand, cheese-cutter)
 Forage cap
 Gandhi cap
 Garrison cap
 Glengarry
 Greek fisherman's cap (also known as a Breton cap or a fiddler's cap)
 Juliet cap
 Karakul
 Kepi
 Kippah (also known as yarmulke or skull cap) — worn by Jewish males
 Knit cap (also known as a Tuque, stocking cap, wool cap, watch cap, ski cap, bobble hat)
 Kufi (also known as a kofia; an African cap worn with a dashiki)
 Lika cap
 M43 field cap
 Mao cap
 Meyrick Helmet
 Monmouth cap
 Newsboy cap
 Nightcap
 Nurse cap
 Ochipok
 Papakhi
 Patrol cap
 Peaked cap
 Phrygian cap
 Rastacap
 Sailor cap
 Shako
 Shower cap
 Sindhi cap
 Sports visor
 Square academic cap
 Stormy Kromer cap
 Swim cap
 Tam o' Shanter
 Taqiyah, worn by Muslim males
 Toque
 Tubeteika
 Ushanka
 Utility cover
 Zucchetto

Baseball caps

 Baseball cap
 Fitted cap
 Snapback
 Trucker hat

Present day depictions of caps 
Caps might have started off as a way to keep people shaded from the sun, but now they are much more than that. Caps have made a staple in the both the sports and fashion industries, one leading into the other.

Sports 
Like previously stated caps are typically designed with a visor which makes it perfect for keeping a person cool from the heat and sheltering a person's eyes from the sun, so it was a matter of time before they made it to the sports industry. The first sport to adopt wearing caps was baseball, the hats was made out of straw and were worn on April 24, 1849, by the New York Knickerbockers. However, within a few years time the team began to wear a cap made of fine merino wool, that featured a crown and an attached visor. This design became the prototype for caps of that time and still the most popular in present day. It's also not the only design for baseball hats but other sports as well, such as cricket, golf and tennis.

Fashion 
Sportswear found its way to fashion in the nineteenth century and on the contrary to what many believe it began to actually cater to the wants and needs of women. Sports cap however made an impact on the fashion industry around the 1980s when the company New Era, who had been designing hats for sports teams, began designing and selling hats to the general public. Baseball caps, fitted caps, snapback caps and truckers hats would then be seen in music videos, films, runways and even on Princess Diana's head, which helped nurture her appearance as the "people's princess." Along with hats, sports jerseys also became available in the 1980s as well, and now licensed apparel is a multi-billion dollar industry.

See also 
 Bonnet, until about 1700, the usual word for brimless male headgear
 Cap (sport), metaphorical term
 List of headgear

References

 
Headgear